A loading dock or loading bay is an area of a building where goods vehicles (usually road or rail) are loaded and unloaded. They are commonly found on commercial and industrial buildings, and warehouses in particular. Loading docks may be exterior, flush with the building envelope, or fully enclosed. They are part of a facility's service or utility infrastructure, typically providing direct access to staging areas, storage rooms, and freight elevators.

Basics

In order to facilitate material handling, loading docks may be equipped with the following:
 Bumpers – protect the dock from truck damage, may also be used as a guide by the truck driver when backing up.
 Dock leveler – a height-adjustable platform used as a bridge between dock and truck, can be operated via mechanical (spring), hydraulic, or air powered systems.
 Dock lift – serves the same function as a leveler, but operates similar to a scissor lift to allow for greater height adjustments.
 Dock seals or dock shelters – compressible foam blocks against which the truck presses when parked; seals are used at exterior truck bays in colder climates, where this will provide protection from the weather.
 Truck or vehicle restraint system – a strong metal hook mounted to the base of the dock which will hook to the frame or bumper of a trailer and prevents it from rolling away during loading operations, can be operated via manual, hydraulic, or electrical systems; this system can replace or work in conjunction with wheel chocks.
 Dock light – a movable articulating light mounted inside the dock used to provide lighting inside the truck during loading operations.
 Indicator lights - show truck drivers when to back in or pull out.
 Loading dock software – provides a method for tracking and reporting on the loading dock activity.
Side shift - the truck dock is equipped with a side shift facility to enable accurate aligning of the roller deck with the truck. This facility includes two hydraulic cylinder assemblies, one at the front and one at the rear end of the dock, and enables a left/right movement.

Warehouses that handle palletized freight use a dock leveler, so items can be easily loaded and unloaded using power moving equipment (e.g. a forklift). When a truck backs into such a loading dock, the bumpers on the loading dock and the bumpers on the trailer come into contact but may leave a gap; also, the warehouse floor and the trailer deck may not be horizontally aligned.  In North 
A dock leveler bridges the gap between a truck and a warehouse to safely accommodate a forklift.

Where it is not practical to install permanent concrete loading docks, or for temporary situations, then it is common to use a mobile version of the loading dock, often called a yard ramp.

Dangers

There can be very serious accidents on loading bays. One example is trailer creep (also known as trailer walk, or dock walk), which occurs when the lateral and vertical forces exerted each time a forklift truck enters and exits the trailer cause the trailer to slowly move away from the dock, resulting in separation from the dock leveler. Factors that affect trailer creep are the weight and speed of the lift truck and load, the gradient of the ground the trailer is parked on, the condition of the suspension, tire air pressures, the type of transition being used (dock levelers, dock boards), and whether the trailer has been disconnected or if it is still connected to the tractor. Trailer creep is often prevented by a vehicle restraint system.

Separation of a vehicle from the loading dock also occurs when a driver prematurely pulls away while the truck is still being loaded/unloaded. This issue is usually caused through a driver not correctly observing traffic lighting signals on a loading bay which prohibit the movement of the trailer. It is also important to ensure that drivers are adequately trained on the safe system of work they are expected to follow.

Loading zone
In different parts of the world, a section of a public or private road may be allocated for loading goods or persons, at specific or at all times. There are parking signs and/or road markings to warn motorists of parking regulations. These areas are known as loading zones or loading bays in many jurisdictions.  They are generally monitored by parking inspectors, and vehicles found to be violating the rules can be towed or fined.

Safety
There are many ways to prevent an accident at a loading dock. Different forms of safety preparation include dock lights, back-up lights, trailer restraints, wheel chocks, heavy duty rising roller barrier, safety gates and safety netting. There are many online courses for safety training, and it is very important to regularly audit equipment, making sure that it is correctly assembled and in good working order.

Components of Loading Docks
A loading dock leveler is a piece of equipment which is typically mounted to the exterior dock face or recessed into a pit at a loading dock. Commonly referred to as “bridging the gap”, a dock leveler allows for the movement of industrial vehicles (e.g. forklifts, pallet jacks) between a building and a transport vehicle. Because of the different heights and sizes of many freight and semi-trucks, a dock leveler is an all-encompassing fixed solution to fit varying transports, capacities and budgets.

Although there are many different types of dock levelers many share common components:

 Dock: Area of a warehouse or building where loading/unloading of transport vehicles takes place.
 Dock pit: Recessed opening in the building's floor which accommodates the pit-style dock leveler. Pits are commonly lined along the edges with reinforcing steel angles that are embedded in concrete.
 Shim: Steel plates used to help level pit-mounted dock levelers. Shims may be placed under the frame structure and welded in place to provide a structural load path to the foundation of the building.
 Frame: Supporting structure of a dock leveler.
 Deck: The deck assembly is the most visual aspect of the loading dock leveler. Driven and walked over often, most decks have an anti-skid surface such as a tread plate to provide traction at the various working angles. The deck assembly pivots at the back end furthest from the transport vehicle (or, more commonly, the dock door opening).
 Lip: The lip assembly is pivotally attached to the deck assembly at the end closest to the transport. Often stored when the leveler is not in use, or sometimes used as barrier protection for an industrial vehicle, the lip pivots from a vertical stored position onto the bed of the transport vehicle's floor. Lips are operated either manually, by pull chain, or hydraulically with an electric pump driving a piston to lift the plate and move the lip.
 Toe guard: Protective shield mounted flush to the side of a dock assembly in order to prevent toe and foot injuries while dock leveler is above the dock.
 Activation system: Providing the motive power of the dock leveler, these systems can be mechanical (springs) pneumatic (air bladders) or hydraulic. They may or may not require external power interfaces, depending on the type of leveler.
 Bumpers: Help to prevent the transport vehicle from contacting and damaging the exterior of the building, dock leveler or vehicle restraint. Commonly made from rubber, they range in size, projection and are based on vehicles serviced among other factors.

A flexible, less-expensive alternative to a loading dock leveler is a dock plate or dock board. Often more portable and not fixed to a dock or transport vehicle, dock plates and dock boards and metal ramps which help bridge the gap between dock and truck. Dock plates are commonly made out of aluminum and suited for lighter loads, such as handcars or dollies. Dock boards are generally made out of steel and suited for heavier loads such as motorized equipment or electric pallet jacks.

References

External links

 Loading Dock Equipment Manufacturers (LODEM)
 Loading Dock Dimensional Tags

Freight transport
Architectural elements